This is a list of Australian television events and premieres which occurred, or are scheduled to occur, in 2012, the 57th year of continuous operation of television in Australia.

Events 

 22 January – Network Ten relaunch Young Talent Time for Sunday nights as part of its Super Sunday lineup. The show was later moved to Friday nights and was cancelled later in the year, due to low ratings.
 30 January – Nine's Today show launches its closer widescreen package (which adds the "9" Watermark) and slogan "I Wake Up With Today". Mornings launches with Sonia Kruger and David Campbell as hosts. On the same night, Nine's A Current Affair launches its new look and slogan "(city name)'s No.1".
 27 March – Leigh Sexton and Jennifer Evans win the third season of My Kitchen Rules.
 29 March – Ajay Rochester and teammate Matthew Palmer win the first series of Excess Baggage.
 15 April – Hamish Blake wins the Gold Logie Award for Most Popular Personality on Australian Television at the 2012 Logie Awards.
 22 April – The Nine Network wins its first official ratings week since September 2010, thanks mainly to the launch of The Voice.
 4 May – Dance group Lil' Banditz Krew win the 2012 version of Young Talent Time, the show was cancelled one month later after a record of low ratings.
 8 May – Margie Cummins wins the seventh season (the "Singles" edition) of The Biggest Loser.
 16 May – Music and television personality Ian "Dicko" Dickson wins the second season of The Celebrity Apprentice Australia.
 23 May – The opening game of the 2012 State of Origin series recorded 2.51 million metropolitan viewers, the highest-rated broadcast of the annual State of Origin series since the introduction of OzTAM ratings in 2001.
 24 May – Subscription television providers Foxtel and Austar complete a merger transaction of the two companies, with services for customers migrating to one platform as of 1 July.
 17 June – Singer Johnny Ruffo and his partner Luda Kroitor win the twelfth season of Dancing with the Stars.
 18 June – Karise Eden wins the first season of The Voice.
 21 June – Fox Sports wins the ASTRA Award for Channel of the Year at the 2012 ASTRA Awards.
 30 June – After almost 30 years, Nine drops the US first-run syndicated entertainment television newsmagazine Entertainment Tonight following cutbacks on overseas purchases. Ten subsequently picks up the series.
 1 July – Brad Cranfield and Lara Welham win the fifth season of The Block with a record profit of $506,000.
 20 July – The Nine Network has decided not to renew the studio contract with Sony Pictures after 5 years of films and television broadcasting. In 2013, the Seven Network won the licence to its broadcasts.
 25 July – Andrew De Silva wins the sixth season of Australia's Got Talent; Andy Allen wins the second season of Masterchef Australia.  
 28 July – 13 August – Nine and Foxtel broadcast the 2012 Olympic Games with live coverage on the Nine Network, GEM and Fox Sports from early evening until the following early morning.
 13 August – Nine Network launch the ninth season of Big Brother Australia which has returned after a 4-year absence after Network Ten axed it in July 2008, hosted by Sonia Kruger.
 15 August – Police officers Shane Haw and Andrew Thoday win the second season of The Amazing Race Australia.
 19 August – Callum Hann, runner-up of the second season of MasterChef Australia, wins an All-Stars edition of the cooking program.
 21 August – The Australian Rugby League Commission announces that the Nine Network and Fox Sports have retained the broadcast rights for rugby league in Australia, with the signing of a A$1.025 billion, five-year deal.
 15 October – Seven's Melbourne news bulletin records a total of just 192,000 viewers – making it its least-watched bulletin since Christmas Day in 2007.
 23 October – Mike Snell wins the only series of I Will Survive.
 7 November – Benjamin Norris wins the ninth season of Big Brother Australia. Norris, the first openly gay person to win the program, proposed to his boyfriend, also named Ben, during the show's live finale.
 20 November – Samantha Jade wins the fourth season of The X Factor, the first female artist to win the program.
 22 November – Seven News sports reporter Leith Mulligan is sacked after the bulletin suffers an embarrassing wipeout in the ratings, losing all 40 weeks against the rival Nine News Melbourne.
 26 November – Ten's Breakfast has its last edition, Ron Wilson leaves Ten after 3 decades, and Matt White leaves Seven's Today Tonight after 4 years.
 29 November – Millie Lincoln and Chard Oldfield win the fourth season of Beauty and the Geek Australia.
 8 December – Channel [V] announces Seth Sentry as the winner of its annual viewer-voted title of [V] Oz Artist of the Year.

Celebrity Deaths
 11 March – Ian Turpie (aged 68), host of The New Price Is Right from 1981 to 1986 and again in 1989.
 20 March – Cliff Neville (age unknown), former 60 Minutes producer.
 3 May – Edith Bliss (aged 52), reporter for Simon Townsend's Wonder World.
 18 August – Alan Bateman (aged 76), television writer, producer and executive notable as the creator of Home and Away.

Channels
 New channels
 16 February – A&E
 17 February – Fox Footy
 26 February – FX
 26 March – Extra (Nine Network/NBN Television)
 1 May – WIN Gold (WIN Television, Channel Nine Adelaide, Channel Nine Perth)
 24 September – TVSN (Free-to-air)
 12 December – NITV (re-launched as free-to-air)

 Renamed channels
 1 March – STUDIO (replacing STVDIO)
 4 May – Gold (replacing WIN Gold) (WIN Television, Channel Nine Adelaide, Channel Nine Perth)
 20 August – SoHo (replacing W)
 23 July – SF (replacing Sci-Fi)

Ratings

Premieres

Domestic series

International series

Telemovies

Miniseries

Documentary specials
{| class="wikitable plainrowheaders sortable"
|+ 
! scope="col" | Documentary
! scope="col" | Original airdate(s)
! scope="col" | Network(s)
! scope="col" class="unsortable" | Ref
|-
! scope="row" | Orchids: My Intersex Adventure
| align=center| 
| ABC1
| align=center| 
|-
! scope="row" | 
| align=center| 
| ABC1
| align=center| 
|-
! scope="row" | Geoff Huegill: Be Your Best – Hunt For Gold
| align=center| 
| Bio.
| align=center| 
|-
! scope="row" | MegaTruckers
| align=center| 
| A&E
| align=center| 
|-
! scope="row" | 
| align=center| 
| 
| align=center| 
|-
! scope="row" | Great Barrier Reef
| align=center| 
| Nine Network
| align=center| 
|-
! scope="row" | 2 Hours
| align=center| 
| Seven Network
| align=center| 
|-
! scope="row" | Giants
| align=center| 
| Seven Network
| align=center| 
|-
! scope="row" | Tony Robinson's London Games Unearthed
| align=center| 
| 
| align=center| 
|-
! scope="row" | Sporting Nation| align=center| 
| ABC1
| align=center| 
|-
! scope="row" | Inside| align=center| 
| Nine Network
| align=center| 
|-
! scope="row" | Muddied Waters| align=center| 
| 7Two
| align=center| 
|-
! scope="row" | Who Makes the News?| align=center| 
| ABC News 24
| align=center| 
|-
! scope="row" | George Rrurrambu| 
| ABC1
| align=center| 
|-
! scope="row" | Great Southern Land| 
| ABC1
| align=center| 
|-
! scope="row" | Murdoch| 
| SBS One
| align=center|
|-
! scope="row" | Possum Wars| 
| ABC1
| align=center|
|-
! scope="row" | Redesign My Brain| 
| ABC1
| align=center|
|-
! scope="row" | Sydney Harbour – Life on the Edge| 
| National Geographic Channel
| align=center|
|}

Specials

Programming changes

Changes to network affiliation
This is a list of programs which made their premiere on an Australian television network that had previously premiered on another Australian television network. The networks involved in the switch of allegiances are predominantly both free-to-air networks or both subscription television networks. Programs that have their free-to-air/subscription television premiere, after previously premiering on the opposite platform (free-to air to subscription/subscription to free-to air) are not included. In some cases, programs may still air on the original television network. This occurs predominantly with programs shared between subscription television networks.

Criteria for inclusion:
 Australian premiere episodes are airing on the new network.

Free-to-air premieres
This is a list of programs which made their premiere on Australian free-to-air television that had previously premiered on Australian subscription television. Programs may still air on the original subscription television network.

Subscription premieres
This is a list of programs which made their premiere on Australian subscription television that had previously premiered on Australian free-to-air television. Programs may still air on the original free-to-air television network.

Endings

Returns

Film and television productions

Big 6 film productions

Animation film productions

Other film productions

Television productions

 Notes 
 Puppetry of the Penis: Live at the Forum'' was originally scheduled to air on 6 April 2012 (Good Friday), but this was changed for unknown reasons to 13 April 2012 instead.

References